Ahmad Kurd (13 September 1949 – 9 May 2020) was a Palestinian politician, who served as the mayor of Deir al-Balah located in the central Gaza Strip. He was elected as mayor in 2005 as the candidate for the political party and militant group, Hamas. He also occupied the job of local sheikh in the Deir al-Balah mosque. Kurd was the director of the Gaza Strip-based charity organization Salah Society. The organization has a school which has enrolled 1,000 orphans and other youngsters in Deir al-Balah.

Kurd was born in Deir al-Balah camp a year after his family of five fled their home village near Ashkelon. That family now consists of 70 people, and Ahmad Kurd himself has 11 children with his Russian wife. Kurd stated to The Washington Post, "I'm not asking to return to Ashkelon. I want to live in Deir al Balah, in a decent city, in an independent Palestinian state like other states."

See also
 Deir el-Balah
 Hamas

External links

1949 births
2020 deaths
Palestinian Sunni Muslims
Hamas members
People from Deir al-Balah
Palestinian philanthropists
Hebron University alumni
People from Deir al-Balah Camp
Mayors of Deir al-Balah